

See also
 List of highest towns by country
 List of European cities by elevation

References

Elevation, cities by